Inger Haldis Løite (born 27 October 1958 in Gjerstad) is a Norwegian politician for the Labour Party.

She was elected to the Norwegian Parliament from Aust-Agder in 2005. On the local level she was a member of Gjerstad municipal council from 1999 to 2007.

Outside politics, she has worked for Telenor for the majority of her professional career and has been active in the labour union LO. She does not have higher education.

References

1958 births
Living people
Members of the Storting
Aust-Agder politicians
Labour Party (Norway) politicians
21st-century Norwegian politicians